Goforth is an unincorporated community located in Pendleton County, Kentucky, United States. Its post office  is closed.

References

Unincorporated communities in Pendleton County, Kentucky
Unincorporated communities in Kentucky